Mur Pano, or simply Pano, is an Austronesian language spoken by about three quarters of the thousand inhabitants of Mur village on the north coast of Madang Province, Papua New Guinea.   The other quarter of the population speaks Molet as their primary language.

References

Languages of Madang Province
Korap languages
Articles citing ISO change requests